Gerrit van Voorst (18 July 1910 – 13 November 1986) was a Dutch swimmer. He competed in the men's 4 × 200 metre freestyle relay event at the 1928 Summer Olympics.

References

External links
 

1910 births
1986 deaths
Olympic swimmers of the Netherlands
Swimmers at the 1928 Summer Olympics
Swimmers from Amsterdam
Dutch male freestyle swimmers
20th-century Dutch people